During the 1977–78 English football season, Wimbledon F.C. competed in the Football League Fourth Division, following promotion from the Southern Football League the previous season. It was Wimbledon's first ever season in the Football League.

Season summary
Wimbledon enjoyed a satisfactory season upon their Football League debut, finishing 13th in the Fourth Division. Manager Allen Batsford had resigned in January, to be replaced by Dario Gradi.

Kit
Adidas became Wimbledon's kit sponsors. The kit remained white but also featured Adidas' trademark "three stripes" in blue from collar to cuffs on the shirt and on the sides of the shorts.

Squad

|}

Staff

Transfers

In

Out
 Ian Cooke - retired

Matches

Football League Division Four
Key

In Result column, Wimbledon's score shown first
H = Home match
A = Away match

pen. = Penalty kick
o.g. = Own goal

Results

FA Cup

League Cup

References

Wimbledon F.C. seasons
Wimbledon F.C.